Pseudotaxiphyllum is a genus of mosses belonging to the family Plagiotheciaceae.

The genus has almost cosmopolitan distribution.

Species:
 Pseudotaxiphyllum arquifolium (Bosch & Sande Lac.) Z.Iwats.
 Pseudotaxiphyllum densum Iwatsuki, 1987

References

Hypnales
Moss genera